Sound of the Desert is a 1932 Polish romantic film adventure directed by Michał Waszyński.

Cast
Nora Ney ...  Dżemila 
Eugeniusz Bodo ...  Sheik Abdullah 
Maria Bogda ...  Jenny Burton 
Adam Brodzisz ...  Sgt. Filip Milczek 
Witold Conti ...  Sgt. Tarnowski 
Janusz Dziewoński   
Kazimierz Jarocki   
Paweł Owerłło   
Stefan Wroncki ...  Przemytnik

References

External links 
 

1932 films
1930s Polish-language films
Polish black-and-white films
Films directed by Michał Waszyński
1932 romantic comedy films
1932 adventure films
Polish adventure films
Polish romantic comedy films